Cecelie S. Berry is an American writer.

Biography
She is a graduate of Harvard College and Harvard Law School. Her work has appeared in The New York Times, The Washington Post, Newsweek, Salon, Child, and O, The Oprah Magazine.

She is the niece of American classical composer Julia Perry (25 March 1924 – 12 October 1979).

She married Scott Flood in September 1988.

Awards
 2005 American Book Award

Works

Anthologies

References

External links
"An Interview with Cecelie S. Berry", Literary Mama

American women writers
Year of birth missing (living people)
Living people
Harvard Law School alumni
Harvard College alumni
American Book Award winners
21st-century American women